Earl Joseph Barbry Sr. (October 2, 1950 − July 31, 2013) was an American politician and Native American leader.

Raised on the Tunica-Biloxi Indian reservation, in Marksville, Louisiana, Barbry was elected tribal chairman of the Tunica-Biloxi tribe of Louisiana in 1978 and served until his death. In September 1981, the tribe received recognition from the United States Government. He also help opened a hotel-casino for the tribe. Barbry died of cancer on July 31, 2013, aged 62, in Alexandria, Louisiana. He was also the longest serving leader of any federally recognized tribe in the United States.

References

1950 births
2013 deaths
People from Marksville, Louisiana
Native American leaders
Deaths from cancer in Louisiana